Renzo Pigni (24 September 1925 – 25 January 2019) was an Italian politician who served as a Deputy (from 1953 to 1972) and as Mayor of Como (from 1992 to 1993).

References

1925 births
2019 deaths
Mayors of Como
Deputies of Legislature II of Italy
Deputies of Legislature III of Italy
Deputies of Legislature IV of Italy
Deputies of Legislature V of Italy
Politicians of Lombardy